Pseudothelomma is a genus of crustose pin lichens in the family Caliciaceae. It currently contains two species. The genus was circumscribed in 2016 by lichenologists Maria Prieto and Mats Wedin. The generic name Pseudothelomma refers to its resemblance to genus Thelomma, where the two species used to be classified. Both species grow on dry exposed wood, particularly fence posts.

Description
Pseudothelomma has a thallus that is crustose, grey, with a thin cortex. The ascomata are immersed in wrinkles, and are flat, sometimes with a green or yellow pruina on the mazaedia. The spores have a single septum and are black-brown in colour. Secondary chemicals found in Pseudothelomma include usnic acid in the thallus (occasionally), and epanorin and rhizocarpic acid in the hymenium and mazaedium.

Species
Pseudothelomma occidentale  (2016)
Pseudothelomma ocellatum  (2016)

References

Caliciales
Taxa described in 2016
Caliciales genera